"Nobody's Supposed to Be Here" is the lead single released by Canadian recording artist Deborah Cox from her second studio album One Wish (1998). It is Cox's most successful song, peaking at number two on the Billboard Hot 100 for eight weeks, and spending a then-record 14 weeks at number one on the Hot R&B/Hip-Hop Songs chart. In 2017, Billboard ranked the song at number five on its "Greatest of All Time Hot R&B/Hip-Hop Songs" chart. It is written and produced by Anthony "Shep" Crawford.

Commercial performance
The song reached number two on the Billboard Hot 100 in the week of December 5, 1998, and remained there for eight consecutive weeks. It was held from the top spot by R. Kelly and Celine Dion's  'I'm Your Angel' (for six weeks) and Brandy's 'Have You Ever?' (for two weeks), making it one of the longest stays at number two in Billboard history. The song ranked at number nine on the Billboard Year-End Hot 100 singles of 1999.

The song reached number one on Billboard Hot R&B/Hip-Hop Songs in the week of November 7, 1998, and remained there for a then-record-breaking 14 weeks. This record was tied by Mariah Carey in 2005 with her song "We Belong Together", and then broken by Mary J. Blige in 2006 with "Be Without You", which spent 15 weeks at number one. During this period, "Nobody's Supposed to Be Here" held four Hot 100 number-one singles out of the top position: "Doo Wop (That Thing)" by Lauryn Hill (three weeks), "Lately" by Divine (two weeks), the aforementioned "Have You Ever?" (four weeks), and "Angel of Mine" by Monica (one week), as well as the number seven-peaking "Love Like This" by Faith Evans (three weeks). The song ranked at number two on the Billboard Year-End R&B/Hip-Hop Songs of 1999, and at number five on the Greatest of All Time Hot R&B/Hip-Hop Songs chart.

The song was remixed by dance music producer Hex Hector, and peaked at number one on the Billboard Dance Club Songs chart in the week of October 24, 1998. As of 1999, the song has sold 1,900,000 copies in the United States and has been certified Platinum by the Recording Industry Association of America (RIAA).

Critical reception
Larry Flick of Billboard wrote, "Cox previews her second album with a stirring old-school soul ballad that's perhaps the best vocal showcase she's ever had. The groove cruises at a languid, finger-poppin' jeep pace, giving her plenty of room to get down and dirty, vamping as if she's lived every syllable of the song's tale of a love fraught with drama. Justice prevailing, pop and R&B radio programmers will find this a refreshing change of pace from the saccharine ballads currently glutting the airwaves. And if they don't, they'll have Hex Hector's wholly accessible uptempo dance reconstruction to embrace. It's easily among the best efforts of the young remixer's career. In all, this is a fine single hinting that Cox is about to pay off on all of the promise and hype generated by her first album two years ago."

Awards
 1998: Soul Train Award for Best R&B/Soul Single – Female
 1999: Soul Train Lady of Soul Award for Best R&B/Soul Song of the Year

Track listings

US CD and cassette single, European CD single
 "Nobody's Supposed to Be Here" – 4:10
 "Nobody's Supposed to Be Here" (dance mix) – 4:13

US maxi-CD single
 "Nobody's Supposed to Be Here" (Hex Hector's club mix) – 10:07
 "Nobody's Supposed to Be Here" (dance radio mix) – 4:13
 "Nobody's Supposed to Be Here" (Hex's dub) – 6:17
 "Nobody's Supposed to Be Here" (original version) – 4:21
 "Nobody's Supposed to Be Here" (original version instrumental) – 4:21

US 12-inch single
A1. "Nobody's Supposed to Be Here" (Hex Hector's club mix) – 10:07
A2. "Nobody's Supposed to Be Here" (original version) – 4:21
B1. "Nobody's Supposed to Be Here" (Hex's dub) – 6:17
B2. "Nobody's Supposed to Be Here" (Hex's beats) – 4:02
B3. "Nobody's Supposed to Be Here" (dance radio mix) – 4:13

UK CD1
 "Nobody's Supposed to Be Here" (Club 69 radio mix) – 3:49
 "Nobody's Supposed to Be Here" (album version) – 4:21
 "Sentimental" (album version) – 4:26

UK CD2
 "Nobody's Supposed to Be Here" (Club 69 radio mix) – 3:49
 "It's Over Now" (Hex Retro-Future club mix) – 7:27
 "Nobody's Supposed to Be Here" (Hex Hector dance radio mix) – 4:13

Australian CD single
 "Nobody's Supposed to Be Here" (original version) – 4:21
 "Nobody's Supposed to Be Here" (Hex Hector's club mix) – 10:07
 "Nobody's Supposed to Be Here" (dance radio mix) – 4:13
 "Nobody's Supposed to Be Here" (Hex's dub) – 6:17
 "Nobody's Supposed to Be Here" (original version instrumental) – 4:21

Charts

Weekly charts

Year-end charts

Decade-end charts

All-time charts

Certifications and sales

|}

Release history

Usage in media
The Hex Hector Dance Mix version of this song was featured on episode 6 of RuPaul's Drag Race All Stars (season 3) during the "Lip Sync for Your Legacy" between BeBe Zahara Benet and BenDeLaCreme. It was also featured on episode 3 of Canada's Drag Race: Canada Vs. The World during the lip sync of Victoria Scone and Silky Nutmeg Ganache.

See also
 R&B number-one hits of 1998 (USA)
 R&B number-one hits of 1999 (USA)
 Number-one dance hits of 1998 (USA)

References

1990s ballads
1998 singles
1998 songs
Arista Records singles
Bertelsmann Music Group singles
Contemporary R&B ballads
Deborah Cox songs
Music videos directed by Darren Grant
Songs written by Montell Jordan
Songs written by Shep Crawford
Soul ballads